Kaneyoshi (written: 兼良, 兼吉, 銀芳, 金義 or かねよし in hiragana) is a masculine Japanese given name. Notable people with the name include:

 (1402–1481), Japanese kugyō
, Japanese manga artist
 (1939–2007), Japanese yakuza member
 (1916–1945), Japanese World War II flying ace
 (1917–1997), Japanese photographer
Prince Kaneyoshi

Japanese masculine given names